Cambropallas is an extinct genus of trilobite in the family Holmiidae. There is one described species in Cambropallas, C. telesto.

References

Olenelloidea
Articles created by Qbugbot